Rachel Ruddy is a senior Dublin ladies' footballer. She was a member of the Dublin teams that won the All-Ireland Senior Ladies' Football Championship in 2010, 2017 and 2019. In 2017 she received her second All Star award. Ruddy has also played for the Dublin senior camogie team.

Early years, family and education
Ruddy is the daughter of Vivian Ruddy, a former Ballyboden Wanderers Gaelic footballer who originally came from Achill Island. Her sister, Ciara Ruddy, has also played for the Dublin senior ladies' football team. Ruddy graduated in physiotherapy from Trinity College Dublin.

Playing career

Clubs
Ballyboden St Enda's
Ruddy has won senior Leinster and Dublin camogie championships with Ballyboden St Enda's. Between 2010 and 2014 she helped the club complete a five in a row of Dublin titles. Her team mates at Ballyboden included Emer Lucey, Ciara Lucey and her sister, Ciara Ruddy. Ruddy was also a member of the Ballyboden team that won the 2010 Dublin Ladies' Senior Football Championship. She also played for Ballyboden in the 2017 Dublin final.

Dublin University GAA
While attending Trinity College Dublin, Ruddy played camogie for Dublin University GAA.

Singapore Gaelic Lions
While working as a physiotherapist in Singapore, Ruddy played for Singapore Gaelic Lions.

Inter-county

Ladies' Gaelic football
Ruddy made her senior inter-county debut for Dublin in 2010 against Laois. She was a member of the Dublin team that won the 2010 All-Ireland Senior Ladies' Football Championship Final. In 2010 she also won her first All Star.  She also played in the 2014 final against Cork but missed the 2015 and 2016 finals because of a back injury. She was subsequently a member of the Dublin teams that won the 2017, and 2019 All-Ireland finals. In 2017 Ruddy won her second All Star.

Camogie
Ruddy has also played for the Dublin senior camogie team. In 2008 she was nominated for an All-Star.

Personal life
Ruddy works as a physiotherapist at Our Lady's Children's Hospital, Crumlin. It is a tradition that All-Ireland champions visit this hospital after the final. In September 2019 Ruddy hosted her Dublin team mates during their visit. On 19 October 2019 Ruddy married Seamus Conboy  in Ravello, Italy.

Honours

Ladies' Gaelic football
Dublin
All-Ireland Senior Ladies' Football Championship
Winners: 2010, 2017, 2019: 3
Runner up: 2014 1
Ballyboden St Enda's
Dublin Ladies' Senior Football Championship
Winners: 2010: 
Runner up: 2017
Individual
All Stars
Winner: 2010, 2017 : 2

Camogie
Ballyboden St Enda's
Leinster Senior Club Camogie Championship
Winners: 2008
Dublin Senior Club Camogie Championships
Winners: 2006, 2008, 2010, 2011, 2012, 2013, 2014

References

1988 births
Living people
Dublin camogie players
Dublin inter-county ladies' footballers
Ballyboden St Enda's Gaelic footballers
Ballyboden St Enda's camogie players
Dual camogie–football players
Alumni of Trinity College Dublin
Irish physiotherapists